Georges Valentin (24 January 1892 – 21 September 1981) was a French cyclist. He competed in two events at the 1912 Summer Olympics.

References

External links
 

1892 births
1981 deaths
French male cyclists
Olympic cyclists of France
Cyclists at the 1912 Summer Olympics
Sportspeople from Deux-Sèvres
Cyclists from Nouvelle-Aquitaine